This is a list of Albanian cyclists.

Male cyclists 
 Besmir Banushi (born 1988)
 Haki Doku (born 1969)
 Tony Bakalli (born 1989)
 Xhuliano Kamberaj (born 1994)
 Iltjan Nika (born 1995)
 Ylber Sefa (born 1991)
 Altin Sufa (born 1988)
 Eugert Zhupa (born 1990)

Female cyclists 
 Lisa Allkokondi (born 1995)
 Keti Fetishi (born 1997)
 Joli Karafili (born 1995)
 Xhorxhia Kristollari (born 1995)
 Xhejna Metalja (born 1997)
 Loreta Pirro (born 1997)
 Jona Rizvanolli (born 1992)
 Elona Rusta (born 1996)

See also 
 Albanian Cycling Federation

References

 
Albania